The Vest Cemetery is a historic cemetery in rural western Izard County, Arkansas.  It is located at the end of Vest Cemetery Road (County Road 197), north of the hamlet of Boswell, adjacent to the site of the former Vest family homestead.  It is a rectangular parcel, with 72 known graves dating back to the early settlement period of Boswell in the 1870s.  A portion of the cemetery is lined by a low rock wall, built to keep cattle from grazing on the family graves of the Cockersham family.  The entire cemetery is now lined by woven wire fencing.

The cemetery was listed on the National Register of Historic Places in 2016.

See also
 National Register of Historic Places listings in Izard County, Arkansas

References

External links
 

Cemeteries on the National Register of Historic Places in Arkansas
Buildings and structures completed in 1875
National Register of Historic Places in Izard County, Arkansas
1875 establishments in Arkansas
Cemeteries established in the 1870s